Assan Musa Camara (otherwise known as Andrew David Camara; 21 April 1923 – 15 September 2013) was a politician from Gambia. He served as Vice President of Dawda Jawara, almost continuously from 1972 to 1977, and then again from 1981 to 1982, and the Member of Parliament (MP) for Kantora from 1960 to 1987.

He founded the Gambian People's Party and contested the elections of 1987 and 1992 against then incumbent President Dawda Jawara.

Biography
The son of a Fula farmer and cattle breeder, Camara was born in Mansajang Kunda near Basse Santa Su in April 1923. He was an Anglican convert, taking the name Andrew David. He was first educated in Mansajang Anglican Mission School, and then at St. Mary's Primary School in Bathurst (now Banjul) from 1937 to 1940. He was asked to join the team set up by Bishop John Daly to find a suitable location in British Gambia for an Anglican mission station, which led to the establishment of the Anglican Mission School at Kristi Kunda in the Upper River Region. He also studied at Kristikunda Mission School where he obtained his Cambridge School Certificate and later at Georgetown College in M.I.D where he graduated with a qualified teacher's certificate.

He began working as a teacher in Kristi Kunda in January 1949, and became its head teacher afterwards. But he resigned in 1959 and stand successfully as an independent candidate with the support from the Gambian Democratic Party in Kantoura constituency in the 1960 House of Representatives election.

Camara was later appointed by Governor Sir Edward Henry Windley to the Executive Council as a minister without portfolio and held that position until 1961, when he was appointed as Minister of Education after the appointment of Pierre Sarr N'Jie as chief minister. He joined the United Party (UP) and successfully defended his seat for Kantoura constituency as a UP candidate in the 1962 election.

In 1963, he switched to the People's Progressive Party (PPP). He was appointed as Minister of Education, Labour and Social Welfare in November 1963. He was later appointed as the Minister of External Affairs in January 1968 until 1974, the period which saw Gambia developed close ties with Guinea and Cape Verde during his time in office. 

In September 1972, he was appointed as vice president following the dismissal and resignation of Sheriff Mustapha Dibba. While he was still vice president, he became Minister of Local Government and Lands. A few months later, he converted to Islam and adopted the name Assam Musa. After the 1977 election, he was appointed as Minister of Finance and Trade and was replaced by Alieu Badara Njie as vice president. He also served briefly as Minister of Education. In August 1978, he once again becomes vice president when Njie resigned. During the failed 1981 coup, as a senior minister in Banjul, he played an important role in resisting the coup attempt and actions helped persuade the Senegalese government to intervene to restore President Dawara.

He came under the president's suspicion of backing independent candidates in the Upper River Division in the 1982 general election. After the election, he lost the vice presidency and dropped out from the cabinet. He resigned from the PPP on 4 February 1986. Later that same month, he does the Gambia People's Party (GPP), along with two former ministers.

After the 1994 coup, the GPP was banned and he himself was barred from standing in the parliament. In December 2002, the United Democratic Party (UDP) was reported to appoint Camara as its national chairman but Camara himself turned it down. In January 2005, he supported the National Alliance for Democracy and Development (NADD), which he was chosen as its chairman. Tensions within the NADD led to his resignation on 7 March 2006, and he retired from politics soon after.

He died in Banjul in September 2013 after a long illness and was buried in Old Jeshwang Cemetery, Kanifang.

References

1923 births
2013 deaths
Vice-presidents of the Gambia
Finance ministers of the Gambia
Education ministers of the Gambia
People from Upper River Division
Members of the House of Representatives of the Gambia